The Vought F-8 Crusader (originally F8U) is a single-engine, supersonic, carrier-based air superiority jet aircraft built by Vought for the United States Navy and United States Marine Corps (replacing the Vought F7U Cutlass), and for the French Navy. The first F-8 prototype was ready for flight in February 1955.  The F-8 served principally in the Vietnam War. The Crusader was the last American fighter with guns as the primary weapon, earning it the title "The Last of the Gunfighters".

The RF-8 Crusader was a photo-reconnaissance development and operated longer in U.S. service than any of the fighter versions. RF-8s played a crucial role in the Cuban Missile Crisis, providing essential low-level photographs impossible to acquire by other means. United States Navy Reserve units continued to operate the RF-8 until 1987.

Design and development

In September 1952, the United States Navy announced a requirement for a new fighter. Korean War experience had demonstrated that .50 caliber (12.7 mm) machine guns were no longer sufficient and as a result the new fighter was to carry a 20 mm (0.79 in) cannon. 4x20 mm had become Navy standard prior to the Korean war: F2H, F9F, F3D and also the F7U and F4D, among others, preceded the F8U. In response, the Vought team led by John Russell Clark, created the V-383. Unusual for a fighter, the aircraft had a high-mounted wing which necessitated the use of a fuselage-mounted short and light landing gear. The major contribution to the short main gear, however, was the variable incidence wing that meant the plane did not take off and land extremely nose up, which was a characteristic of swept and low aspect ratio winged fighters.

The Crusader was powered by a Pratt and Whitney J57 turbojet engine.  The engine was equipped with an afterburner which, on the initial production F8U-1 aircraft, increased the thrust of the engine from 10,200 lb to 16,000 lb, but, unlike later engines, had no intermediate thrust settings. The Crusader was the first jet fighter in US service to reach 1,000 mph; U.S. Navy pilot R.W. Windsor reached 1,015 mph on a flight in 1956.

The most innovative aspect of the design was the variable-incidence wing which pivoted by 7° out of the fuselage on takeoff and landing (not to be confused with variable-sweep wing). This allowed a greater angle of attack,  increasing lift without compromising forward visibility. This innovation helped the F-8's development team win the Collier Trophy in 1956. Simultaneously, the lift was augmented by leading-edge flaps drooping by 25° and inboard flaps extending to 30°. The rest of the aircraft took advantage of contemporary aerodynamic innovations with area-ruled fuselage, all-moving stabilators, dog-tooth notching at the wing folds for improved yaw stability, and liberal use of titanium in the airframe. The armament, as specified by the Navy, consisted primarily of four 20 mm (.79 in) autocannons; the Crusader happened to be the last U.S. fighter designed with guns as its primary weapon. They were supplemented with a retractable tray with 32 unguided Mk 4/Mk 40 Folding-Fin Aerial Rocket (Mighty Mouse FFARs), and cheek pylons for two guided AIM-9 Sidewinder air-to-air missiles. In practice, AIM-9 Sidewinder missiles were the F-8's primary weapon; the 20mm guns were "generally unreliable". Moreover, it achieved nearly all of its kills with Sidewinders. Vought also presented a tactical reconnaissance version of the aircraft called the V-392.

Major competition came from the Grumman F-11 Tiger, the upgraded twin-engine McDonnell F3H Demon (which would eventually become the McDonnell Douglas F-4 Phantom II), and lastly, the North American F-100 Super Sabre hastily adapted to carrier use and dubbed the "Super Fury".

In May 1953, the Vought design was declared a winner and in June, Vought received an order for three XF8U-1 prototypes (after adoption of the unified designation system in September 1962, the F8U became the F-8). The first prototype flew on 25 March 1955 with John Konrad at the controls. The aircraft exceeded the speed of sound during its maiden flight. The development was so trouble free that the second prototype, along with the first production F8U-1, flew on the same day, 30 September 1955.

Crusader III
In parallel with the F8U-1s and -2s, the Crusader design team was also working on a larger aircraft with even greater performance, internally designated as the V-401. Although the Vought XF8U-3 Crusader III was externally similar to the Crusader and sharing with it such design elements as the variable incidence wing, the new fighter was larger and shared few components.

Operational history

Prototype XF8U-1s were evaluated by VX-3 beginning in late 1956, with few problems noted. Weapons development was conducted at Naval Air Weapons Station China Lake and a China Lake F8U-1 set a U.S. National speed record in August 1956.

An early F8U-1 was modified as a photo-reconnaissance aircraft, becoming the first F8U-1P. Subsequently, the RF-8A was equipped with cameras rather than guns and missiles. On 16 July 1957, Major John H. Glenn Jr, USMC, completed the first supersonic transcontinental flight in a F8U-1P, flying from NAS Los Alamitos, California, to Floyd Bennett Field, New York, in 3 hours, 23 minutes, and 8.3 seconds.

First fleet operators
VX-3 was the first unit to qualify for carrier operations but several aircraft were lost in accidents, several of them fatal to their pilots.

VF-32 renamed the squadron the "Swordsmen" in keeping with the Crusader theme. The Pacific Fleet received the first Crusaders at NAS Moffett Field in northern California and the VF-154 "Grandslammers" (named in honor of the new 1,000-mph jets and subsequently renamed the "Black Knights") began their F-8 operations. Later in 1957, in San Diego VMF-122 accepted the first Marine Corps Crusaders.

In 1962, the Defense Department standardized military aircraft designations generally along Air Force lines. Consequently, the F8U became the F-8, with the original F8U-1 redesignated F-8A.

Fleet service
The Crusader became a "day fighter" operating off the aircraft carriers. At the time, U.S. Navy carrier air wings had gone through a series of day and night fighter aircraft due to rapid advances in engines and avionics. Some squadrons operated aircraft for very short periods before being equipped with a newer higher performance aircraft. The Crusader was the first post-Korean War aircraft to have a relatively long tenure with the fleet.

Cuban Missile Crisis
The unarmed RF-8A proved good at getting low-altitude detailed photographs, leading to carrier deployments as detachments from the Navy's VFP-62 and VFP-63 squadrons and the Marines' VMCJ-2. Beginning on 23 October 1962 during the Cuban Missile Crisis, RF-8As flew extremely hazardous low-level photo reconnaissance missions over Cuba, the F-8's first true operational flights. Two-ship flights of RF-8As left Key West twice each day, to fly over Cuba at low level, then return to Jacksonville, where the film was offloaded and developed, to be rushed north to the Pentagon.

These flights confirmed that the Soviet Union was setting up MRBMs in Cuba. The RF-8As also monitored the withdrawal of the Soviet missiles. After each overflight, the aircraft was given a stencil of a dead chicken. The overflights went on for about six weeks and returned a total of 160,000 images. The pilots who flew the missions received Distinguished Flying Crosses, while VFP-62 and VMCJ-2 received the prestigious U.S. Navy Unit Commendation.

Mishap rate

The Crusader was not an easy aircraft to fly, and was often unforgiving in carrier landings, where it suffered from poor recovery from high sink rates, and the poorly designed, castering nose undercarriage made it hard to steer on the deck. Safe landings required the carriers to steam at full speed to lower the relative landing speed for Crusader pilots. The stacks of the oil-burning carriers on which the Crusader served belched thick black smoke, sometimes obscuring the flight deck, forcing the Crusader's pilot to rely on the landing signal officer's radioed instructions. It earned a reputation as an "ensign eliminator" during its early service introduction. The nozzle and air intake were so low when the aircraft was on the ground or the flight deck that the crews called the aircraft "the Gator". Not surprisingly, the Crusader mishap rate was relatively high compared to its contemporaries, the Douglas A-4 Skyhawk and the F-4 Phantom II. However, the aircraft did possess a desirable capability, as proved when several Crusader pilots took off with the wings folded and were able to land the aircraft. The pilot reported that the control forces were higher than normal. The Crusader was capable of flying in this configuration, though the pilot would be required to reduce aircraft weight by jettisoning stores and dumping fuel before landing. 1,261 Crusaders were built. By the time it was withdrawn from the fleet, 1,106 had been involved in mishaps.

Vietnam War

When conflict erupted in the skies over North Vietnam, it was US Navy Crusaders from  that first tangled with Vietnam People's Air Force (the North Vietnamese Air Force) MiG-17s, on 3 April 1965. The MiGs claimed the downing of a Crusader, and Lt Pham Ngoc Lan's gun camera revealed that his cannons had set an F-8 ablaze, but Lieutenant Commander Spence Thomas had managed to land his damaged Crusader at Da Nang Air Base, the remaining F-8s returning safely to their carrier. At the time, the Crusader was the best dogfighter the United States had against the nimble North Vietnamese MiGs. The US Navy had evolved its "night fighter" role in the air wing to an all-weather interceptor, the F-4 Phantom II, equipped to engage incoming bombers at long range with missiles such as AIM-7 Sparrow as their sole air-to-air weapons, and maneuverability was not emphasized in their design. Some experts believed that the era of the dogfight was over as air-to-air missiles would knock down adversaries well before they could get close enough to engage in dogfighting. As aerial combat ensued over North Vietnam from 1965 to 1968, it became apparent that the dogfight was not over and the F-8 Crusader and a community trained to prevail in air-to-air combat was a key ingredient to success. In a pitched air-battle between USN F-8s and VPAF MiG-21s on 01 August 1968, ace fighter pilot Nguyen Hong Nhi fired a pair R-3S AAMs at a pair of F-8s, the second R-3S making a successful hit, claiming one F-8 shot-down, and following a brief dogfight with the other F-8, another pair of F-8s entered into the fray and fired two Sidewinder AAMs at Nguyen Hong Nhi, who was hit, and safely ejected from his stricken MiG-21; the downing of ace fighter pilot Nguyen credited to F-8H pilot Lt. McCoy of VF-51, USS Bon Homme Richard. 

The Crusader also became a "bomb truck" in war, with both ship-based U.S. Navy units and land-based US Marine Corps squadrons attacking communist forces in both North and South Vietnam. 

US Marine Crusaders flew only in the south, while Navy Crusaders flew only from the small Essex-class carriers. Marine Crusaders also operated in Close Air Support missions.

Despite the "last gunfighter" moniker, the F-8s achieved only four victories with their cannon; the remainder were accomplished with AIM-9 Sidewinder missiles, partly due to the propensity of the 20 mm (.79 in) Colt Mk 12 cannons' feeding mechanism to jam under G-loading during high-speed dogfighting maneuvers. Between June and July 1966, during 12 engagements over North Vietnam, Crusaders claimed four MiG-17s for two losses. Crusader pilots would claim the best kill ratio of any American type in the Vietnam War, 19:3. Of the 19 aircraft claimed during aerial combat, 16 were MiG-17s and three were MiG-21s. While VPAF pilots claimed 11 F-8s shot down by MiGs, official US sources indicate that only three F-8s were lost in air combat, all of them during 1966, to cannon fire from opponents in MiG-17s. A total of 170 F-8 Crusaders would be lost to all causes – mostly ground fire and accidents – during the war.

End of service with U.S. Navy

LTV built and delivered the 1,219th (and last) U.S. Navy Crusader to VF-124 at NAS Miramar on 3 September 1964.

The last active duty Navy Crusader fighter variants were retired from VF-191 and VF-194 aboard  in 1976 after almost two decades of service, setting a first for a Navy fighter.

The photo reconnaissance variant continued to serve in the active duty Navy for yet another 11 years, with VFP-63 flying RF-8Gs up to 1982, and with the Naval Reserve flying their RF-8Gs in two squadrons (VFP-206 and VFP-306) at Naval Air Facility Washington / Andrews AFB until the disestablishment of VFP-306 in 1984 and VFP-206 on 29 March 1987 when the last operational Crusader was turned over to the National Air and Space Museum.

The F-8 Crusader is the only aircraft to have used the AIM-9C which is a radar-guided variant of the Sidewinder. When the Crusader retired, these missiles were converted to the AGM-122 Sidearm anti-radiation missiles used by United States attack helicopters against enemy radars.

NASA

Several modified F-8s were used by NASA in the early 1970s, proving the viability of both digital fly-by-wire technology (using data-processing equipment adapted from the Apollo Guidance Computer), as well as supercritical wing design.

French Navy

Following carrier trials aboard Clemenceau on 16 March 1962, by two VF-32 F-8s from the American carrier USS Saratoga, the Crusader was chosen and 42 F-8s were ordered, the last Crusaders produced.

The French Crusaders were based on the F-8E, but were modified in order to allow operations from the small French carriers, with the maximum angle of incidence of the aircraft's wing increased from five to seven degrees and blown flaps fitted. The aircraft's weapon system was modified to carry two French Matra R.530 radar or infra-red missiles as an alternative to Sidewinders, although the ability to carry the American missile was retained. Deliveries of the new aircraft, dubbed the F-8E(FN), started in October 1964 and continued until February 1965, with the Aéronavales first squadron, Flotille 12F reactivated on 1 October 1964. To replace the old Corsairs, Flotille 14.F received its Crusaders on 1 March 1965.

In October 1974, (on Clemenceau) and June 1977 (on Foch), Crusaders from 14.F squadron participated in the Saphir missions over Djibouti. On 7 May 1977, two Crusaders went separately on patrol against supposedly French Air Force (4/11 Jura squadron) F-100 Super Sabres stationed at Djibouti. The leader intercepted two fighters and engaged a dogfight (supposed to be a training exercise) but quickly called his wingman for help as he had actually engaged two Yemeni MiG-21s. The two French fighters switched their master armament to "on" but, ultimately, everyone returned to their bases. This was the only combat interception by French Crusaders.

The Aéronavale Crusaders flew combat missions over Lebanon in 1983 escorting Dassault-Breguet Super Étendard strike aircraft. In October 1984, France sent Foch for Operation Mirmillon off the coast of Libya, intended to calm Colonel Gaddafi down, with 12.F squadron. The escalation of the situation in the Persian Gulf, due to the Iran-Iraq conflict, triggered the deployment of Clemenceau task force and its air wing, including 12.F squadron. 1993 saw the beginning of the missions over the former Yugoslavia. Crusaders were launched from both carriers cruising in the Adriatic Sea. These missions ceased in June 1999 with Operation Trident over Kosovo.

The French Crusaders were subject to a series of modifications throughout their life, being fitted with new F-8J-type wings in 1969 and having modified afterburners fitted in 1979. Armament was enhanced by the addition of R550 Magic infra-red guided missiles in 1973, with the improved, all-aspect Magic 2 fitted from 1988. The obsolete R.530 was withdrawn from use in 1989, leaving the Crusaders without a radar-guided missile. In 1989, when it was realised that the Crusader would not be replaced for several years due to delays in the development of the Rafale, it was decided to refurbish the Crusaders to extend their operating life. Each aircraft was rewired and had its hydraulic system refurbished, while the airframe was strengthened to extend fatigue life. Avionics were improved, with a modified navigation suite and a new radar-warning receiver. The 17 refurbished aircraft were redesignated as F-8P (P used for "Prolongé" -extended- and not to be confused with the Philippine F-8P). Although the French Navy participated in combat operations in 1991 during Operation Desert Storm and over Kosovo in 1999, the Crusaders stayed behind and were eventually replaced by the Dassault Rafale M in 2000 as the last of the type in military service.

Philippine Air Force

In late 1977, the Philippine government purchased 35 secondhand U.S. Navy F-8Hs that were stored at Davis-Monthan AFB in Arizona. Twenty-five of them were refurbished by Vought and the remaining 10 were used for spare parts. As part of the deal, the U.S. would train Philippine pilots using the TF-8A. The Crusaders were manned by the 7th Tactical Fighter Squadron at Basa Air Base and were mostly used for intercepting Soviet bombers. But due to lack of spares and the rapid deterioration of the aircraft, the remaining F-8s were grounded in 1988 and left on an open grass field at Basa Air Base. They were finally withdrawn from service in 1991 after they were badly damaged by the Mount Pinatubo eruption, and have since been offered for sale as scrap.

Variants

XF8U-1 (XF-8A) (V-383) – the two original unarmed prototypes.
F8U-1 (F-8A) – first production version, J57-P-12 engine replaced with more powerful J57-P-4A starting with 31st production aircraft, 318 built.
YF8U-1 (YF-8A) – one F8U-1 fighter used for development testing.
YF8U-1E (YF-8B) – one F8U-1 converted to serve as an F8U-1E prototype.
F8U-1E (F-8B) – added a limited all-weather capability thanks to the AN/APS-67 radar, the unguided rocket tray was sealed shut because it was never used operationally, first flight: 3 September 1958, 130 built.
XF8U-1T – one XF8U-2NE used for evaluation as a two-seat trainer.
F8U-1T (TF-8A) (V-408) – two-seat trainer version based on F8U-2NE, fuselage stretched 2 ft (0.61 m), internal armament reduced to two cannon, J57-P-20 engine, first flight 6 February 1962. The Royal Navy was initially interested in the Rolls-Royce Spey-powered version of TF-8A but chose the Phantom II instead. Only one TF-8A was built, although several retired F-8As were converted to similar two-seat trainers.
YF8U-2 (YF-8C) – two F8U-1s used for flight testing the J57-P-16 turbojet engine.
F8U-2 (F-8C) – J57-P-16 engine with 16,900 lbf (75 kN) of afterburning thrust, ventral fins added under the rear fuselage in an attempt to rectify yaw instability, Y-shaped cheek pylons allowing two Sidewinder missiles on each side of the fuselage, AN/APQ-83 radar retrofitted during later upgrades. First flight: 20 August 1957, 187 built. This variant was sometimes referred to as Crusader II.
F8U-2N (F-8D) – all-weather version, unguided rocket pack replaced with an additional fuel tank, J57-P-20 engine with 18,000 lbf (80 kN) of afterburning thrust, landing system which automatically maintained present airspeed during approach, incorporation of AN/APQ-83 radar. First flight: 16 February 1960, 152 built.
YF8U-2N (YF-8D) – one aircraft used in the development of the F8U-2N.
YF8U-2NE – one F8U-1 converted to serve as an F8U-2NE prototype.
F8U-2NE (F-8E) – J57-P-20A engine, AN/APQ-94 radar in a larger nose cone, dorsal hump between the wings containing electronics for the AGM-12 Bullpup missile, payload increased to 5,000 lb (2,270 kg), Martin-Baker ejection seat, AN/APQ-94 radar replaced AN/APQ-83 radar in earlier F-8D. IRST sensor blister (round ball) was added in front of the canopy. First flight: 30 June 1961, 286 built.
F-8E(FN) – air superiority fighter version for the French Navy, significantly increased wing lift due to greater slat and flap deflection and the addition of a boundary layer control system, enlarged stabilators, incorporated AN/APQ-104 radar, an upgraded version of AN/APQ-94. A total of 42 built.
F-8H – upgraded F-8D with strengthened airframe and landing gear, with AN/APQ-84 radar. A total of 89 rebuilt.
F-8J – upgraded F-8E, similar to F-8D but with wing modifications and BLC like on F-8E(FN), "wet" pylons for external fuel tanks, J57-P-20A engine, with AN/APQ-124 radar. A total of 136 rebuilt.
F-8K – upgraded F-8C with Bullpup capability and J57-P-20A engines, with AN/APQ-125 radar. A total of 87 rebuilt.
F-8L – F-8B upgraded with underwing hardpoints, with AN/APQ-149 radar. A total of 61 rebuilt.
F-8P – 17 F-8E(FN) of the Aéronavale underwent a significant overhaul at the end of the 1980s to stretch their service life another 10 years. They were retired in 1999.
F8U-1D (DF-8A) – several retired F-8A modified to controller aircraft for testing of the SSM-N-8 Regulus cruise missile. DF-8A was also modified as drone (F-9 Cougar) control which were used extensively by VC-8, NS Roosevelt Rds, PR; Atlantic Fleet Missile Range.
DF-8F – retired F-8A modified as controller aircraft for testing of missiles including at the USN facility at China Lake.
F8U-1KU (QF-8A) – retired F-8A modified into remote-controlled target drones
YF8U-1P (YRF-8A) – prototypes used in the development of the F8U-1P photo-reconnaissance aircraft – V-392.
F8U-1P (RF-8A) – unarmed photo-reconnaissance version of F8U-1E, 144 built.
RF-8G – modernized RF-8As.
LTV V-100 – revised "low-cost" development based on the earlier F-8 variants, created in 1970 to compete against the F-4E Phantom II, Lockheed CL-1200 and F-5-21 in a tender for U.S. Military Assistance Program (MAP) funding. The unsuccessful design was ultimately only a "paper exercise."
XF8U-3 Crusader III (V-401) – new design loosely based on the earlier F-8 variants, created to compete against the F-4 Phantom II; J75-P-5A engine with 29,500 lbf (131 kN) of afterburning thrust, first flight: 2 June 1958, attained Mach 2.39 in test flights, canceled after five aircraft were constructed because the Phantom II won the Navy contract.

Operators

Former operators

French Navy (Aéronavale)

Philippine Air Force

United States Navy
United States Marine Corps
NASA

Aircraft on display

France
F-8E(FN)
151732 (French Navy Side Number 1) – Musee des Avions de Chasse, Beaune.
151750 (French Navy Side Number 19) – Musée des Ailes Anciennes, Toulouse.

F-8P

151733 (French Navy Side Number 3) – Lann Bihoue Airport, Le Meneguen.
151735 (French Navy Side Number 4) – Musee Europeen de lAviation de Chasse, Montelimar-Ancone.
151738 (French Navy Side Number 7) – Aeronavale Base, Landivisau.
151741 (French Navy Side Number 10) – Musee de l air et de l Espace, (The Air and Space Museum), Paris, France.
151742 (French Navy Side Number 11) – Musee de l aeronautique navale, Rochefort.
151754 (French Navy Side Number 23) – Aeronavale Base, Landivisau.
151760 (French Navy Side Number 29) – Aeronavale Base, Landivisau.
151767 (French Navy Side Number 36) – Musee des Avions de Chasse, Beaune.
151768 (French Navy Side Number 37) – Airport in Cuers.
151770 (French Navy Side Number 39) – Aeronavale Base, Landivisau.

Philippines
F-8H
147056 – Philippine Air Force Aerospace Museum, Villamor Air Base, Manila.
147060 - Basa Air Base, Floridablanca, Pampanga.
148661 – Clark Air Base, Angeles City.
148696 - Fort Del Pilar, Baguio.

United States

XF8U-1 (XF-8A)
138899 – Museum of Flight in Seattle, Washington.

XF8U-2 (XF-8C)
140448 – McAuliffe-Shepard Discovery Center in Concord, New Hampshire.

F8U-1 (F-8A)
141351 – NAS Jacksonville Heritage Park, Naval Air Station Jacksonville, Florida (relocated from former NAS Cecil Field).
141353 – Edwards AFB, California.
143703 – USS Hornet Museum, former Naval Air Station Alameda, Alameda, California.
143755 – Marine Corps Air Station Miramar, California.
143806 – Wings of Freedom Aviation Museum, former Naval Air Station Willow Grove, Willow Grove, Pennsylvania.
144427 – Pima Air and Space Museum adjacent to Davis-Monthan AFB in Tucson, Arizona.
145336 – Planes of Fame at Chino, California.
145347 – National Naval Aviation Museum at Naval Air Station Pensacola, Florida.
145349 – Pueblo Weisbrod Aircraft Museum, Pueblo, Colorado.
145397 – Naval Air Engineering Station Lakehurst, Lakehurst, New Jersey.
F8U-2 (F-8C)
145527 - under restoration to airworthiness by a private owner in Seattle, Washington,
145546 – Edwards AFB, California.
145592 - under restoration to airworthiness by a private owner in Seattle, Washington,
146963 – Marine Corps Air Station Beaufort, South Carolina.
146973 – Marine Corps Air Station Kaneohe Bay, Hawaii
147034 – (nose section only) USS Hornet Museum, former NAS Alameda, Alameda, California.
149150 – NAS Oceana Aviation Heritage Park, Naval Air Station Oceana, Virginia.
F8U-2N (F-8D)
148693 – Mid America Air Museum in Liberal, Kansas.
F8U-2NE (F-8E)
 150920 – Flying Leatherneck Aviation Museum at Marine Corps Air Station Miramar, California
F-8E(FN)
 151765 – under restoration to airworthiness by a private owner in Fort Myers, Florida
F8U-1P (RF-8G)
144617 – Flying Leatherneck Aviation Museum at Marine Corps Air Station Miramar, California
144618 – Celebrity Row, Davis-Monthan AFB (North Side), Tucson, Arizona.
145607 – Castle Air Museum (former Castle AFB), Atwater, California.
145608 – (nose section only) Pacific Coast Air Museum, Santa Rosa, California.
145609 – National Museum of Naval Aviation, Naval Air Station Pensacola, Pensacola, Florida.
145645 – USS Alabama Battleship Memorial Park, Mobile, Alabama.
146860 – Smithsonian Institution's National Air and Space Museum Udvar-Hazy Center in Chantilly, Virginia, adjacent to Dulles International Airport.
146858 – in storage at Flying Leatherneck Aviation Museum at Marine Corps Air Station Miramar, California
146882 – Frontiers of Flight Museum in Dallas, Texas.
146898 – Fort Worth Aviation Museum in Fort Worth, Texas.

F-8H
147909 – NAD Soroptimist Park, Kitsap Lake, Bremerton, Washington, about 1 mile away from Naval Hospital Bremerton.  Aircraft is on loan from the National Naval Aviation Museum, Pensacola, Florida.

F-8J

150904 – Air Zoo in Kalamazoo, Michigan.

F8U-2 (F-8K)
145550 – USS Intrepid Museum in New York City, New York.
146931 – Estrella Warbirds Museum in Paso Robles, California.
146939 – Patriots Point Naval & Maritime Museum aboard ex-USS Yorktown (CV-10), Mount Pleasant, South Carolina.
146983 – Marine Corps Air Station Kaneohe Bay, Hawaii.
146985 – Valiant Air Command Warbird Museum at Space Coast Regional Airport in Titusville, Florida
146995 – Pacific Coast Air Museum, adjacent to the Sonoma County Airport in Santa Rosa, California
147030 – USS Midway Museum in San Diego, California.

F-8L
145449 – Naval Air Station Fallon, Fallon, Nevada.

F8U Cockpit

145399 – Under restoration at Moffett Historical Museum, Moffett Federal Airfield, California

Specifications (F-8E)

{{Aircraft specs
|ref=The Great Book of Fighters and Quest for Performance Combat Aircraft since 1945 Joseph F. Baugher 
|prime units?=kts

|crew=1
|length ft=55
|length in=11.6
|length note=
|span ft=35
|span in=8
|span note=
|height ft=15
|height in=9.1
|height note=
|wing area sqft=375
|wing area note=
|aspect ratio=3.4
|airfoil=root: NACA 65A006 mod; tip: NACA 65A005 mod
Zero-lift drag coefficient: CD0.0133
Drag area: 
|empty weight lb=18800
|empty weight note=
|gross weight lb=29000
|gross weight note=
|max takeoff weight lb=34000
|max takeoff weight note=
|fuel capacity= 
|more general=

|eng1 number=1
|eng1 name=Pratt & Whitney J57-P-20A
|eng1 type=afterburning turbojet engine
|eng1 lbf=11400
|eng1 note=
|eng1 lbf-ab=18000

|max speed kts=1066
|max speed note=at 
|max speed mach=1.8
|cruise speed kts=268
|cruise speed note=
|stall speed kts=135
|stall speed note=
|never exceed speed kts=775
|never exceed speed note=
|range nmi=
|range note=
|combat range nmi=394
|combat range note=
|ferry range nmi=1507
|ferry range note=with external fuel
|endurance=
|ceiling ft=58000
|ceiling note=
|g limits=
|lift to drag=12.8
|roll rate=
|climb rate ftmin=
|climb rate note=
|time to altitude=
|wing loading lb/sqft=77.3
|wing loading note=
|fuel consumption lb/mi=
|thrust/weight=0.62

|more performance=

|guns=4× 20 mm (0.79 in) Colt Mk 12 cannons in lower fuselage, 125 rpg
|hardpoints= 2× side fuselage mounted Y-pylons (for mounting AIM-9 Sidewinders and Zuni rockets) and 2× underwing pylon stations 
|hardpoint capacity=4,000 lb (2,000 kg)

|hardpoint missiles=
4× AIM-9 Sidewinder or Matra Magic (French Navy only) air-to-air missiles
2× AGM-12 Bullpup air-to-surface missiles
|hardpoint rockets=2× LAU-10 rocket pods (each with 4× 5 inch (127mm) Zuni rockets)
|hardpoint bombs=
8× 250 lb (113 kg) Mark 81 bombs or
8× 500 lb (227 kg) Mark 82 bombs or
2× 1,000 lb (454 kg) Mark 83 bombs or2× 2,000 lb (907 kg) Mark 84 bombs
|avionics=Magnavox AN/APQ-84 or AN/APQ-94 Fire-control radar
}}

See also

References

Notes

Bibliography

Anderton, David A. North American F-100 Super Sabre. London: Osprey Publishing Limited, 1987. .
Glenn, John and Nick Taylor. John Glenn: A Memoir. New York: Bantam, 2000. .
Grant, Zalin. Over the Beach: The Air War in Vietnam. New York: Pocket Books, 1988. .
Grossnick, Roy A. and William J. Armstrong. United States Naval Aviation, 1910–1995. Annapolis, Maryland: Naval Historical Center, 1997. .
Hobson, Chris. Vietnam Air Losses, USAF, USN, USMC, Fixed-Wing Aircraft Losses In Southeast Asia 1961–1973. North Branch, Minnesota: Specialty Press, 2001. .
McCarthy, Donald J., Jr. MiG Killers, A Chronology of U.S. Air Victories in Vietnam 1965–1973. North Branch, Minnesota: Specialty Press, 2009. .
Mersky, Peter. F-8 Crusader Units of the Vietnam War (Osprey Combat Aircraft #7). Oxford, UK: Osprey Publishing Limited, 1998. .
Mersky, Peter. RF-8 Crusader Units over Cuba and Vietnam (Osprey Combat Aircraft #12). Oxford, UK: Osprey Publishing Limited, 1999. .
Mersky, Peter B. Vought F-8 Crusader (Osprey Air Combat). Oxford, UK: Osprey Publishing Limited, 1986. .
Mersky, Peter B. Vought F-8 Crusader: MiG-Master. Wings of Fame, Volume 5, 1996, pp. 32–95. London: Aerospace Publishing. . .
Michel III, Marshall L. Clashes: Air Combat Over North Vietnam 1965–1972. Annapolis, Maryland: Naval Institute Press, 2007, First edition 1997. .
Moise, Edwin E. Tonkin Gulf and the Escalation of the Vietnam War. Chapel Hill, North Carolina: The University of North Carolina Press, 1996.  .
Stijger, Eric. Aéronavale Crusaders. Air International, Vol. 45, No. 4, October 1993, pp. 192–196. .
Tillman, Barrett. MiG Master: Story of the F-8 Crusader (second edition). Annapolis, Maryland: Naval Institute Press, 1990. .
Toperczer, István. MiG-17 And MiG-19 Units of the Vietnam War (Osprey Combat Aircraft #25). Oxford, UK: Osprey Publishing Limited, 2001. .
.
Weaver, Michael E. "An Examination of the F-8 Crusader through Archival Sources." Journal of Aeronautical History, 2018. https://www.aerosociety.com/media/8037/an-examination-of-the-f-8-crusader-through-archival-sources.pdf
Wilson, Stewart. Combat Aircraft since 1945. Fyshwick, Australia: Aerospace Publications, 2000. .
Winchester, Jim, ed. Vought F-8 Crusader. Military Aircraft of the Cold War'' (The Aviation Factfile). London: Grange Books plc, 2006. .

External links

F-8 Crusader factsheet on GlobalSecurity.org

(1968) NAVAIR 01-45HHB-1 NATOPS Flight Manual Navy Model F-8D, F-8E Aircraft
(1978) NAVAIR 01-45HHB-1 NATOPS Flight Manual Navy Model RF-8G Aircraft

F-008 Crusader
Vought F-08 Crusader
Single-engined jet aircraft
High-wing aircraft
Variable-incidence-wing aircraft
Carrier-based aircraft
Aircraft first flown in 1955
Second-generation jet fighters